Neferti X. M. Tadiar is a Filipino scholar and critical theorist. She is a professor of women's, gender, and sexuality studies at Barnard College, chair of the Barnard department of women's, gender, and sexuality studies, and director of the Columbia University Center for the Study of Race and Ethnicity.

Early life and education
Neferti Tadiar was born in San Fernando, La Union to a lawyer, Alfredo Flores Tadiar. She attended the Philippine Science High School but diverted from her original plans to pursue the sciences and studied English and Comparative Literature at the University of the Philippines Diliman and at Duke University.

Scholarly work
Professor Tadiar has taught at Barnard College since 2006 and is on the editorial board of the international cultural studies journal, Social Text. She is known for her work on postcolonial and Philippine studies in books such as Things Fall Away (2009) and Fantasy-Production (2004). She co-edited the collection Beyond the Frame: Women of Color and Visual Representation (2005) with Angela Davis.

Before joining the Barnard faculty, she taught at the University of California, Santa Cruz in the program on the History of Consciousness.

Selected publications
Things Fall Away: Philippine Historical Experience and the Makings of Globalization (Duke University, 2009).
Beyond the Frame: Women of Color and Visual Representation, co-edited with Angela Y. Davis (Palgrave Press, 2005).
Fantasy-Production: Sexual Economies and Other Philippine Consequences for the New World Order (Hong Kong University Press/ Ateneo de Manila University Press, 2004).

See also 

Benedict Anderson
Resil Mojares 
Caroline Hau
Talitha Espiritu
Reynaldo Ileto
Zeus A. Salazar

References 

Duke University alumni
Filipino academics
Filipino women academics
Barnard College faculty
University of California, Santa Cruz faculty
University of the Philippines Diliman alumni
1964 births
Living people